Jim Anderson (born February 23, 1947) is a former American football player and coach. 
He served as the head football coach at the University of Missouri at Rolla—now known as the Missouri University of Science and Technology—from 1992 to 1998. Anderson played college football at the University of Missouri and was selected by the Philadelphia Eagles in the 1969 NFL Draft.

References

1947 births
Living people
American football guards
Indiana State Sycamores football coaches
Missouri Tigers football coaches
Missouri Tigers football players
Missouri S&T Miners football coaches
Truman Bulldogs football coaches
High school football coaches in Missouri